Semaphorin-4A is a protein that in humans is encoded by the SEMA4A gene.

Function 

SEMA4A is a member of the semaphorin family of soluble and transmembrane proteins. Semaphorins are involved in guidance of axonal migration during neuronal development and in immune responses.[supplied by OMIM]

Clinical significance 

A germline variant in SEMA4A (V78M) has been demonstrated to confer risk for colorectal cancer type X.

Recently it has been identified as a novel therapeutic target in Multiple myeloma.

References

Further reading